Dalisay is a surname. Notable people with the surname include:

Jose Dalisay Jr. (born 1954), Filipino writer
Nori Dalisay (born 1938), Filipina actress